Nicolò D'Agostino (born 11 January 2000) is an Italian football player. He plays for Rezzato on loan from Juventus.

Club career
He joined Serie C club Cuneo on loan in the summer of 2017. He made his Serie C debut for Cuneo on 8 November 2017 in a game against Pontedera as an 84th-minute substitute for Stefano Pellini. He finished the season with 6 league appearances for Cuneo, 5 of them as a late substitute.

For the 2018–19 season, he joined Serie D club Rezzato.

References

External links
 

2000 births
People from Rivoli, Piedmont
Footballers from Piedmont
Living people
Italian footballers
Association football midfielders
A.C. Cuneo 1905 players
Serie C players
Serie D players
Sportspeople from the Metropolitan City of Turin